Caddoa is an unincorporated community in Bent County, Colorado, United States.  The U.S. Post Office at Hasty (ZIP Code 81044) now serves Caddoa postal addresses.

A post office called Caddoa was established in 1881, and remained in operation until 1954. The community takes its name from nearby Caddoa Creek.

Caddoa District, from the construction of John Martin Reservoir, moved to Caddoa from the Tucumcari District after the Conchas Project finished.

Geography
Caddoa is located at  (38.047821,-102.963352).

Notable people
 Vena Pointer, Colorado's first female water lawyer and member of the 1933 Caddoa Commission.
 John Wesley Prowers, who operated a stagecoach station at his home in Caddoa.
 James H. Stratton, Brigadier General in the United States Army, who was in charge of the John Martin Reservoir project.

See also

References

Bibliography

External links

Unincorporated communities in Bent County, Colorado
Unincorporated communities in Colorado